The term farnesene refers to a set of six closely related chemical compounds which all are sesquiterpenes.  α-Farnesene and β-farnesene are isomers, differing by the location of one double bond.  α-Farnesene is 3,7,11-trimethyl-1,3,6,10-dodecatetraene and β-farnesene is 7,11-dimethyl-3-methylene-1,6,10-dodecatriene.  The alpha form can exist as four stereoisomers that differ about the geometry of two of its three internal double bonds (the stereoisomers of the third internal double bond are identical).  The beta isomer exists as two stereoisomers about the geometry of its central double bond.

Two of the α-farnesene stereoisomers are reported to occur in nature. (E,E)-α-Farnesene is the most common isomer.  It is found in the coating of apples, and other fruits, and it is responsible for the characteristic green apple odour. Its oxidation by air forms compounds that are damaging to the fruit. The oxidation products injure cell membranes which eventually causes cell death in the outermost cell layers of the fruit, resulting in a storage disorder known as scald.  (Z,E)-α-Farnesene has been isolated from the oil of perilla. Both isomers are also insect semiochemicals; they act as alarm pheromones in termites or food attractants for the apple tree pest, the codling moth. α-Farnesene is also the chief compound contributing to the scent of gardenia, making up ~65% of the headspace constituents.

 has one naturally occurring isomer.  The E isomer is a constituent of various essential oils.  It is also released by aphids as an alarm pheremone upon death to warn away other aphids.  Several plants, including potato species, have been shown to synthesize this pheromone as a natural insect repellent.

See also 
 Farnesol
 Nerolidol
 Prenylation
 Terpene

References 

Insect pheromones
Perfume ingredients
Sesquiterpenes
Polyenes
Semiochemicals